Jack Eadie (born ) was a Canadian football player and coach who was the head coach of the Regina Ruby Club from 1922 to 1923. After his time with Regina he was a multi-sport coach at Berkeley High School from 1924 to 1954, retiring at the age of 65.

Sports career
Eadie played college football at Springfield College in Massachusetts. Eadie's first professional team was the Regina Rugby Club. He played his first season in 1920. In 1922, he was named head coach of Regina. In his first season, Regina went undefeated with a 4–0 record, but lost in the playoffs to the Edmonton Eskimos. He was described in a 1923 article by The Leader-Post as, "undoubtedly one of Canada's best." In his second season, they went 3–1, making the Grey Cup for the first time in team history. However, Regina lost 54–0. Eadie left the Rugby Club in 1924 and became a coach at Berkeley High School in California. He originally was given the tasks of basketball, baseball, and swimming coach but was assigned football in 1931. He retired from coaching in 1954, after 30 seasons. As coach of the baseball team, they won 9 Alameda championships.

References

1880s births
Date of birth missing
Place of birth missing
Year of death missing
Saskatchewan Roughriders players
Saskatchewan Roughriders coaches